Taekwondo competitions at the 2019 Pan American Games in Lima, Peru were held between July 26 to 29, 2019 at the Polideportivo Villa El Salvador, which also hosted the volleyball competitions.

12 medal events were contested. Eight of these events were in Kyorugi (four per gender). 
This edition marked the premiere of the pomsae events. This events were added after the request of the Organizing Committee as it understood that the chances of medal at this sport were very low for the host country. A total of 140 athletes were scheduled to compete.

Medal table

Medalists

Kyorugi
Men

Women

Poomsae

Participating nations
A total of 26 countries qualified athletes. The number of athletes a nation entered is in parentheses beside the name of the country.

Qualification

A total of 140 taekwondo athletes will qualify to compete. Each nation may enter a maximum of 13 athletes (eight in Kyorugi  and five in Poomsae). The host nation, Peru, automatically qualifies the maximum number of athletes (13) and is entered in each event. There will also nine wild card spots awarded in Kyorugi. The spots were awarded at the qualification tournament held in Santo Domingo in March 2019.

See also
Taekwondo at the 2020 Summer Olympics

References

External links
Results book

 
Events at the 2019 Pan American Games
Pan American Games
2019